The Peel Sessions is a compilation album by Gang of Four.

Track listing
All songs written by Dave Allen, Hugo Burnham, Andy Gill, and Jon King, except as noted.

"I Found That Essence Rare"
"Return The Gift"
"5.45"
"At Home He’s A Tourist"
"Natural’s Not In It"
"Not Great Men"
"Ether"
"Guns Before Butter"
"Paralysed" (Gill, King)
"History’s Bunk" (Gill, King)
"To Hell With Poverty!"

Personnel
 Dave Allen - bass guitar, Vocals
 Hugo Burnham - drums, vocals
 Andy Gill - guitar, vocals
 Jon King - vocals, melodica

References

Gang of Four (band) albums
Peel Sessions recordings
1990 live albums
1990 compilation albums
Albums produced by Bob Sargeant